Lowertown Historic District is a national historic district located at Lockport in Niagara County, New York.  The district is predominantly residential in nature, with some commercial structures and warehouses.  The mose elegant homes are along Market Street, east of Chapel Street, facing the Erie Canal.  Notable structures in this district include the Western Block Company Warehouse, a -story stone structure built before 1855; Lockport Bank Building built in 1829, and located at 315-319 Market Street; Washington Hunt House, built in 1831 and home to New York Governor Washington Hunt, and located at 363 Market Street; the former Christ Episcopal Church at 425 Market Street; and the Vine Street School, an Italianate style one-room school built in 1864.

It was listed on the National Register of Historic Places in 1973.

References

External links

Historic American Buildings Survey in New York (state)
Historic districts on the National Register of Historic Places in New York (state)
Gothic Revival architecture in New York (state)
Italianate architecture in New York (state)
Buildings and structures in Niagara County, New York
National Register of Historic Places in Niagara County, New York